Dori J. Maynard (May 4, 1958 – February 24, 2015) was an American author and journalist. She was the president of the Robert C. Maynard Institute for Journalism Education in Oakland, California and the co-author of Letters to My Children, a compilation of nationally syndicated columns by her late father Robert C. Maynard, for which she wrote introductory essays.

Career
Maynard graduated from Middlebury College in Vermont with a BA in American History.

As a reporter, she worked for the Bakersfield Californian, The Patriot Ledger in Quincy, Massachusetts, and the Detroit Free Press. 

She served on the board of the Sigma Delta Chi Foundation, as well as the Board of Visitors for the John S. Knight Fellowships.

Accolades 
In 1993 she and her father became the first father-daughter duo to be appointed Nieman scholars at Harvard University.

She received the "Fellow of Society" award from the Society of Professional Journalists at the national convention in Seattle, Washington, on October 6, 2001, and was voted one of the "10 Most Influential African Americans in the Bay Area" in 2004. 

In 2008, she received the Asian American Journalists Association's Leadership in Diversity Award.

References

External links
www.mije.org
Dori on Diversity
Huffington Post

1958 births
Middlebury College alumni
Nieman Fellows
2015 deaths
Journalism academics
African-American women journalists
African-American journalists
Maynard family
20th-century African-American people
21st-century African-American people
20th-century African-American women
21st-century African-American women